East Grinstead South & Ashurst Wood is an electoral division of West Sussex in the United Kingdom, and returns one member to sit on West Sussex County Council.

Extent
The division covers the southern part of the town of East Grinstead and the village of Ashurst Wood, and it came into existence as the result of a boundary review recommended by the Boundary Committee for England, the results of which were accepted by the Electoral Commission in March 2009.

It comprises the following Mid Sussex District wards: Ashurst Wood Ward, East Grinstead Herontye Ward and the southern part of East Grinstead Town Ward; and of the following civil parishes: of Ashurst Wood and the southern part of East Grinstead.

Election results

West Sussex County Council election, 2017/2017 Election
Results of the election held on 4 May 2017:

2009 Election
Results of the election held on 4  June 2009:

References
Election Results - West Sussex County Council

External links
 West Sussex County Council
 Election Maps

Electoral Divisions of West Sussex